Kalkaska may refer to several places or things associated with the U.S. state of Michigan:

 Kalkaska, Michigan, a village in Kalkaska Township and county seat of Kalkaska County
 Kalkaska County, Michigan
 Kalkaska Township, Michigan
 Kalkaska sand, the state soil of Michigan, named after the county

Henry Schoolcraft neologisms